Iman Kiani (born 19 October 1988), is an Iranian footballer who played for Giti Pasand in the Azadegan League as a defender.

Club career
He joined Sepahan in the summer of 2011 and won the league in his first season.

Club career statistics 
Last Update  15 July 2012

Honours

Club
Sepahan
Iran Pro League (1):
2011–12

References

1988 births
Living people
Sportspeople from Isfahan
Giti Pasand players
Iranian footballers
Sepahan S.C. footballers
Association football defenders